Grindelia subdecurrens is a North American species of flowering plants in the family Asteraceae. It is native to the north-central Mexico, in the States of Aguascalientes, Zacatecas, Guanajuato, and San Luis Potosí.

References

subdecurrens
Plants described in 1836
Flora of Mexico